Craig Alexander Gibbons (born 29 November 1985) is an English competitive swimmer who represented Great Britain at the 2012 Summer Olympics in London.  There, Gibbons anchored the British men's team in the preliminary heats of the 4x100-metre freestyle relay event. Gibbons previously held the British record for the men's 100-metre freestyle and was part of four relay teams that also broke British records. He has competed at major meets for over 10 years and remains one of the fastest British swimmers ever.

For much of his training in the run-up to the Olympics he was based in Aylesbury, Buckinghamshire, swimming for Maxwell Swim Club. He then moved out to Dubai, United Arab Emirates where he trained his own squad with Hamilton Aquatics Swimming Club. Gibbons moved to Malta, to take over as head coach of Sirens ASC, where he led the team to their first ever National Title with swimmers under his guidance qualifying for the first time for the World Championships and the European Youth Olympic Festival. In August 2017 Gibbons was appointed head coach of a newly formed performance team in West London called Natare West London Swimming Club. He now lives in London and coaches alongside 2012 Olympic Medalist Michael Jamieson.

Swimming career
International Appearances include:
 European Championships 2012  Debrecen, Hungary 
 Great Britain v Russia Duel In The Pool 2011  Moscow, Russia 
 Great Britain v Germany Duel In The Pool 2011  Essen, Germany 
 Sarajevo Meet  2010  Sarajevo, Bosnia
 European Championships 2009  Abdi Ipekci Arena, Turkey 
 Eindhoven International 2009  Eindhoven, Holland
 Eindhoven International 2008  Eindhoven, Holland 
 European Championships 2008  Jovanovic Arena, Croatia
 World Championships 2008  MEN Arena, Manchester, Great Britain
 World Championships 2006  Rod Laver Arena, Melbourne, Australia 
 European Championships 2004  Vienna Arena, Austria 
 European Junior Championships 2004  Glasgow, Scotland 
 World School Games  2002  Cannes, France

References

External links 
  British ASA Profile
  Personal Website

British male swimmers
Swimmers at the 2012 Summer Olympics
Olympic swimmers of Great Britain
1985 births
Living people
British male freestyle swimmers